A 2+2 (also 2-plus-2) is a version of the coupé car-body style that has a seat each for the driver and front passenger, and two rear seats.  The latter may be individual "bucket" seats, fold-downs, or a full-width "bucketed" bench seat, but always with less leg room than either the front or a standard 2-door car. The style is different from 4 or 5 seat versions that have normal size rear seats. Some manufacturers which sell coupés without rear seats often market the car as "2+2"

Definition 

By standard definition, all cars in the 2+2 category have two front seats and two rear seats. Other common characteristics for 2+2 cars include relatively little room for the rear passengers and a coupé body with two doors.

Convertibles and targa top cars are often considered 2+2 vehicles.

Usage 
There are many coupés which meet the definition of a 2+2 but are not described by their manufacturers as such. This is because the term 2+2 is most often used to distinguish cars with what typically amounts to "auxiliary" rear seating, at times enlarged from from a 2-seat version of the same model to accommodate it, such as the Jaguar E-type fixed-head coupé 2+2.  Other similar examples include the Lotus Elan +2, and Nissan 300ZX 2+2.

Cars marketed as 2+2

See also
 Car classification
 Coupé
 Targa top
 Grand tourer
 Sports car

References 

Car body styles
Seating